The White Cargo is an ice cream cocktail made with vanilla ice cream and gin. Some versions include maraschino liquor, garnished with freshly grated nutmeg. Its creation is credited to Harry Craddock of The Savoy Hotel in a three ingredient version that includes a splash of dry white wine. Modern versions have added Chardonnay.

References

Cocktails with gin
Cocktails with ice cream
British cuisine
Cocktails with wine
Three-ingredient cocktails
Sweet cocktails
Creamy cocktails
Cocktails with fruit liqueur
Two-ingredient cocktails